Lapithus may refer to:
 Lapiths, a legendary Greek tribe
 Lapathus (Cyprus), a town of ancient Cyprus